6000 may refer to:

 6000 (number) and the 6000s
 The last year of the 6th millennium, a century leap year starting on Saturday
 The Hebrew Year 6000, in the Gregorian 3rd millennium (from 29 September 2239 to 16 September 2240)
 6000 List, the Anti-Corruption Foundation initiative related to 2022 Russian invasion of Ukraine

See also

 6000 series (disambiguation)